Kulachi (کلاچی) is a city named after the Kulachi Baloch tribe and is the headquarter of Kulachi Tehsil (an administrative subdivision) of Dera Ismail Khan District in Khyber-Pakhtunkhwa province of Pakistan.

Economy 
Kulachi is an agricultural city. The area lies at the foot of the Sulaiman Range and hence is irrigated by flood water from Sulaiman Mountains. The system of irrigation is called Rod Kohi, a system of mountain channels or hill-torrents inundating the whole valley of Damaan  ("Rod" means "channel" and "Koh" means "mountain" in Persian). The Rod Kohi system based on "Kulyat Riwajat" (Fromulae and Traditions) governed the irrigation system ever since the Pathan tribes had moved into Damaan. The British officers reduced all these to writing during their Land Settlemts in the later part of nineteenth century. The Bolton Irrigation Notes of 1908 are still considered as the Bible of Rod Kohi Irrigation. The city population consists of two major ethnic groups, the Pushtuns and the Baloch (mostly speaking Saraiki as of now).

Demographics 
According to census 2017, population of Kulachi Tehsil is 101892 whereas population of Kulachi city is 24753.

Notes

External links 
 https://www.citypopulation.de/en/pakistan/distr/admin/dera_ismail_khan/60704__kulachi/

Populated places in Dera Ismail Khan District
Cities in Khyber Pakhtunkhwa